Telefónica Colombia is the largest telecommunications company in Colombia. The company was established in 1947 by Mariano Ospina Pérez. It is owned by the Spanish telecommunications company Telefónica and the Colombian government; the Colombian government has a 32.5% stake in Telefónica Colombia but is trying to sell that under favourable conditions for the sale. The company is headquartered in Bogotá.

See also

References

Telecommunications companies of Colombia
Telefónica
Companies based in Bogotá
Telecommunications companies established in 1947
1947 establishments in Colombia